Jim Bowden is an American technical diver, known as a cave diver and as a deep diver. He has also made six sub-five hundred foot dives.

He was attempting a dual descent with Sheck Exley in the dive which resulted in Exley's death. Bowden had aborted his dive and ascended prior to the events which led to Exley's demise.

References

External links
 Profile of Jim Bowden by Advanced Diver magazine

Year of birth missing (living people)
Living people
American underwater divers
Cave diving explorers
Place of birth missing (living people)
Sportspeople from Austin, Texas
Pioneering technical divers